PM2FGZ (90.00 FM, often abbreviated 90 FM), on air name Elshinta News and Talk or Elshinta, is an all-news radio in Jakarta, Indonesia.

History 
In 1968, the station was started under Suyoso Karsono, a retired Commodore of earliest Indonesian Air Force who built his entertainment businesses that in the beginning pioneered Long Play (LP) recording of the Irama Records. He is a born musician/singer, musical producer, entertainer and broadcaster. Elshinta starts as the first amateur radio in AM channel and named after his youngest daughter: Elshinta Suyoso. At that time, the Elshinta Broadcasting System plays all kind genres of music from Jazz, Classical, Pop, Rock, Reggae, including Hawaiian music. The station's name influenced Suyoso's other group’s/band’s name for off-air programmes, such as: the Elshinta Band played by his sons, the Elshinta’s Friendships Association (EFA) that produced all kinds of merchandise, Elshinta Newsletter, etc. and the popular Elshinta Football team comprised by friends and fans, including the Elshinta Hawaiian Seniors. Only after 1976, the brand name was shortened from the latter became The Hawaiian Seniors. 

Parallel to this, in later years, Suyoso Karsono famously known as Mas Yos established another radio station in FM channel of the Suara Irama Indah. This saw also the reasons why the second radio he built has no longer use his daughter’s name, which was after a new regulation at the time, - one’s can only own one radio station with the same name, thus he went public and Radio Elshinta then acquired by Salim Group. The Suara Irama Indah higher sound quality (now Jak 101 FM), is the first commercial FM radio in Indonesia. It is known, Elshinta further also moved to FM as a music entertainment radio with a few news insert including from BBC World Service and Voice Of America. However, under the new helm and due to limitations of news broadcast pre-1998, Elshinta has then completely abandoned its music programming in 14 February 2000. Today, Elshinta only broadcasts news and talk programming, except sponsored content and affiliations like NHK World Service.

Programming 
 News and Talk Edisi Pagi (morning show, 5-10am)
 News and Talk Edisi Siang (high noon show, 10am-4pm)
 News and Talk Edisi Sore (afternoon to evening show, 4pm-9pm)
 News and Talk Edisi Malam (night show 9pm-12am)
 News and Talk Edisi Dinihari (early morning show, 12-5am)
 Interactive Discussion (11pm-1am, together with News and Talk Malam)
 Komisi Anda (late night discussion show, 1-5am together with News and Talk Dinihari)
 NHK World Service (9:05pm-9:30pm)
 China Radio International (CRI) (5am and 8:30pm)
 Power Breakfast (every monday, 7-8am)

Network 
Elshinta has 8 regional stations that are self-owned. Elshinta regional stations relay Jakarta's broadcast, but sometimes local news session is found in certain stations. Elshinta also has 32 affiliations across the Indonesian archipelago.

Owned stations 
 91.0 Elshinta Semarang (PM4FAH)
 97.6 Elshinta Surabaya (PM6FKO)
 99.9 Elshinta Tegal (PM4FBF)
 93.2 Elshinta Medan (PM3FAP)
 99.6 Elshinta Lampung (PM8FFK, ex-88.5 FM, licensed in Tanggamus Regency)
 103.7 Elshinta Sekayu (South Sumatra) (PM7FDR)
 96.7 Elshinta Palembang (PM7FDK)

Media Group 
Elshinta has its own media group, consists of Elshinta Magazine, Elshinta.com, Jakarta local TV station Elshinta TV, and Fit Radio.

Influence 
In 2016 Jakarta Attack and 2018 Surabaya Attack, Elshinta broadcast updates and commentaries about that terrorism event. However, Elshinta was warned by the Broadcasting Commission (KPI) due to fake explosion news spreading in 2016 Jakarta Attack. Elshinta said that they never spread that hoax news.

References 

News and talk radio stations
Radio stations in Indonesia
Radio stations established in 1972